The 2021 European Road Cycling Championships was the 27th running of the European Road Cycling Championships, that took place from 8 to 12 September 2021 in Trentino, Italy. The event consisted of a total of 6 road races and 7 time trials.

Location
On 10 June 2019 it was announced that, Trentino would host the event from 9 to 13 September 2020, however due to the effects of the COVID-19 pandemic, the event was postponed to 2021, and in its place the 2020 events were instead hosted by Plouay in France.

Race schedule
All times are in CEST (UTC+2).

Medal summary

Elite

Under-23

Junior

Mixed team relay

Medal table

References

External links 
Trentino 2021

European Road Championships by year
European Road Championships, 2021
Road
European Road Championships